Eulophia gracilis is a species of orchid, occurring from Western Tropical Africa to Angola.

Synonyms
Galeandra gracilis (Lindl.) Lindl.
Graphorkis gracilis (Lindl.) Kuntze
Limodorum ciliatum Schumach.
Galeandra extinctoria Lindl.
Eulophia ciliata (Schumach.) Rchb.f.
Graphorkis ciliata (Schumach.) Kuntze
Eulophia preussii Kraenzl.
Eulophia laurentiana Kraenzl.
Eulophia virens A.Chev.

gracilis